Union Free School may refer to the following schools in New York:

Camillus Union Free School, Camillus, listed on the NRHP in Onondaga County
Union Free School (Downsville, New York), listed on the NRHP in Delaware County
Garrison Union Free School, Garrison, listed on the NRHP in Putnam County
Hammondsport Union Free School, Hammondsport, listed on the NRHP in Steuben County
Le Roy House and Union Free School, Leroy, listed on the NRHP in Genesee County
Union Free School (New Hamburg, New York), listed on the NRHP in Dutchess County
Lebanon Springs Union Free School, New Lebanon, listed on the NRHP in Columbia County
Herricks Union Free School District, New Hyde Park
Huntington Union Free School District, South Huntington/Huntington Station
Rocky Point Union Free School District, Rocky Point, NY, in Suffolk County